Julia Sandberg Hansson is a Swedish actress who has featured in several motion pictures, including Postal, The Kreutzer Sonata and Delirium Dance.

External links
Official site

Interview with Luke Ford at lukeford.net

1983 births
Swedish film actresses
Living people